Naser Toure Mahama (born March 17, 1965) is a Ghanaian politician and member of the Seventh Parliament of the Fourth Republic of Ghana representing the Ayawaso East Constituency in the Greater Accra Region on the ticket of the National Democratic Congress.

Personal life 
Naser is a Muslim. He is married (with two children).

Early life and education 
Mahama was born on March 17, 1965. He hails from Nima-Accra, a town in the Greater Accra Region of Ghana. He went to the West Africa Senior High School.He entered Central University College, Ghana and obtained his Bachelor of Science degree in marketing in 1987.

Politics 
Mahama is a member of the National Democratic Congress (NDC). In 2012, he contested for the Ayawaso East seat on the ticket of the NDC sixth parliament of the fourth republic and won.

Employment 
 managing director, Aminasei Oil Company, Accra
 OTA Forex Bureau, Accra
 Member of Parliament (January 7, 2013–present; 2nd term)
 Varied profession

References

Ghanaian MPs 2017–2021
1965 births
Living people
Ghanaian Muslims
National Democratic Congress (Ghana) politicians
Ghanaian MPs 2021–2025